Nerius Alom (born 29 November 1994, in Puncak) is an Indonesian professional footballer who plays as a midfielder for Liga 2 club PSDS Deli Serdang. Nerius has a brother who is also a footballer, Nelson Alom

Club career

Early career
On October 10, 2014, Nerius  was elected the best player in 2014 Indonesia Super League U-21. This award is very appropriate for him because his appearance is incredible, Moreover, he managed to bring Semen Padang U-21 won in the Indonesia Super League U-21 for the first time in this year after defeating Sriwijaya FC U-21

Persipura Jayapura
In 2016, Nerius joined to Persipura Jayapura squad in 2016 Indonesia Soccer Championship A, and Nerius made his debut playing 19 minutes against Bali United F.C. in the second week

Honours

Club
Semen Padang U-21
 Indonesia Super League U-21: 2014
Persipura Jayapura
 Indonesia Soccer Championship A: 2016

References

External links
 Nerius Alom at Soccerway
 Nerius Alom at Liga Indonesia

1994 births
Living people
Indonesian footballers
People from Puncak Regency
Persipura Jayapura players
Semen Padang F.C. players
PSS Sleman players
PSIS Semarang players
Liga 1 (Indonesia) players
Association football midfielders
Sportspeople from Papua